The 2019–20 Toledo Rockets men's basketball team represent the University of Toledo during the 2019–20 NCAA Division I men's basketball season. The Rockets, led by tenth-year head coach Tod Kowalczyk, play their home games at Savage Arena, as members of the West Division of the Mid-American Conference.

Previous season
The Rockets finished the 2018–19 season 25–8, 13–5 in MAC play to win the MAC West division championship. As the No. 2 seed in the MAC tournament, they lost to Northern Illinois in the quarterfinals round. They received an invitation to the National Invitation Tournament where they lost in the first round to Xavier.

Offseason

Departures

Incoming Transfers

Recruiting class of 2019

Roster

Schedule and results

|-
!colspan=9 style=|Exhibition

|-
!colspan=9 style=|Non-conference regular season

|-
!colspan=9 style=| MAC regular season

|-
!colspan=9 style=| MAC tournament

Source

References

Toledo
Toledo Rockets men's basketball seasons